Salto da Divisa is a municipality in the northeast of the Brazilian state of Minas Gerais.  Its population in 2020 was 7,012 inhabitants in a total area of 943.647 km2. It is the easternmost municipality of Minas Gerais

Salto da Divisa belongs to the Almenara statistical microregion. The elevation of the municipal seat is 142 meters. It became a municipality in 1948. This municipality is located on the Jequitinhonha River, which crosses the state boundary with Espírito Santo at this point.

Neighboring municipalities are: Calubi, Jordânia, Santa Maria do Salto, and Jacinto. There are paved connections with the important BR-101, a distance of 48 km. to the east.

Economy 
The main economic activities are cattle raising, and subsistence farming.  The GDP was R$28,985,000 (2005).  There was 1 banking agency in 2006.  There were 63 automobiles in 2007.  The main cash crop was coffee.  In the health sector there were 3 health clinics and 1 hospital with 58 beds.  The score on the Municipal Human Development Index was 0.642 (medium).  This ranked Salta da Divisa 768 out of 853 municipalities in the state, with Poços de Caldas in first place with 0.841 and Setubinha in last place with 0.568. See Frigoletto for the complete list.

In 2006 there were 181 rural farms with 220 hectares of planted area.  Most of the rural area was natural pasture or woodland.  Only 28 of the farms had tractors.  There was a large cattle herd of 81,000 head, the cattle being raised for meat.

References 

Statistics from IBGE
Citybrazil
Frigoletto

Municipalities in Minas Gerais
Populated places established in 1948